Ivan Khristoforovich Gevorkyan, born Hovannes Khachaturi Gevorkyan (March 28, 1907 – October 19, 1989), was a Soviet Armenian surgeon and scientist who published 10 monographs and more than 230 scientific papers. His main research was dedicated to anesthesia, blood transfusion, the treatment of endarteritis of extremities and other surgical illnesses.

Personal life
Ivan Gevorkyan was born in the village Karmir, near the city of Gavar in Armenia.
He graduated from medical school in Leningrad in 1930. During World War II he was a military surgeon, and from 1943, he served as the Chief Surgeon of Yerevan Military Hospital.

Achievements
From 1952-1979 Gevorkyan was the chairman of the Department of Surgery of Yerevan State Medical Institute. Under his leadership 10 doctoral and 30 master's theses were completed. In 1961 he was named an honored scientist of the Armenian SSR. In 1962 Professor Gevorkyan was elected to the ASSR Academy of Sciences as a Corresponding Member, and in 1963 he was elected a member of the Surgeon's International Society in Rome. For many years Gevorkyan performed the duties of chief surgeon of Armenia and was a founder of the Armenian Surgical Association. He was awarded the Order of the Red Banner, the Order of the Red Star, and a number of other medals.

Honors and achievements 
 Honored Scientist of the Armenian SSR (1961)
 Doctor of Medicine (1952)
 Member of the Academy of Sciences of the Armenian SSR (1962).
 Member of International Academy of Surgeons (1963).
Order of the Red Star
Order of the Red Banner

List of main works
 Intra-arterial Medication Use in Surgery (1958), Published in Moscow, Russia 
 Blood Flow Velocity in the Pathology of Limb Vessels (1976)
 Obliterating Endarteritis of Extremities, 152 c. silt. 26 cm, Yerevan Publishing House of the Armenian SSR in 1978
 Handbook for the management of patients with certain acute surgical diseases of the abdomen: (Students of Art. Courses and doctors) / Gevorkyan IH, 140 p. 20 cm, Yerevan Scientific-method. Room. Ministry of Higher Education of the Armenian SSR in 1981
 Peritoneal Mesothelioma (1984)
 Regional Infusion of drugs in the prevention and treatment of complex surgical infection / I. H. Gevorkyan
136, [1] p. silt. Yerevan Hayastan 1987
 Postoperative Adhesive Small Bowel Obstruction, Its Detection, Treatment, and Prevention / IH Gevorkyan, Armenian SSR Academy of Sciences, Institute of Physiology. Orbeli, 103. silt. 20 cm, Yerevan Academy of Sciences of Armenian SSR, 1990

References

1907 births
1989 deaths
Armenian scientists
Soviet surgeons
Yerevan State Medical University alumni
Recipients of the Order of the Red Star
Soviet Armenians